Laura Viaud (born 30 December 1999) is a French female acrobatic gymnast. With partners Léna Carrau and Agathe Meunier, Viaud competed in the 2014 Acrobatic Gymnastics World Championships.
She also competed in the first Olympic European Games in Baku, Azerbaijan, in 2015.

References

1999 births
Living people
French acrobatic gymnasts
Female acrobatic gymnasts